Avenir is an unincorporated community in Alberta, Canada. It has an elevation of 1,952 feet.

References

Localities in Lac La Biche County